Ashmun Bay is a small bay that is a part of the Upper St. Mary's River. It receives water from Ashmun Creek, which drains much of the interior Sault Ste. Marie. It is surrounded by the city of Sault Ste. Marie, Michigan, with a city access ramp for small boats on the north shore.

References

Sault Ste. Marie, Michigan
Bays of Michigan
Bays of Lake Superior
Bodies of water of Chippewa County, Michigan